Disciphania is a genus of flowering plants belonging to the family Menispermaceae.

Its native range is Mexico, Central and southern Tropical America.

Species:

Disciphania calocarpa 
Disciphania cardiophylla 
Disciphania contraversa 
Disciphania convolvulacea 
Disciphania cubijensis 
Disciphania dioscoreoides 
Disciphania domingensis 
Disciphania ernstii 
Disciphania hernandia 
Disciphania heterophylla 
Disciphania inversa 
Disciphania juliflora 
Disciphania killipii 
Disciphania lobata 
Disciphania mexicana 
Disciphania modesta 
Disciphania moriorum 
Disciphania remota 
Disciphania sagittaria 
Disciphania sarcostephana 
Disciphania smithii 
Disciphania spadicea 
Disciphania tessmannii 
Disciphania tricaudata 
Disciphania unilateralis

References

Menispermaceae
Menispermaceae genera